Ahuy is a commune in the Côte-d'Or department in the Bourgogne-Franche-Comté region of eastern France.

The inhabitants of the commune are known as Aqueduciens or Aqueduciennes

Geography
Ahuy is located on the Langres Plateau, 6 km north of Dijon. It can be accessed by road D107A from Dijon in the south passing through the commune and the village and continuing north to join the D966 just north of the commune.

The southern part of the commune overlaps with the urban area of Dijon and the area covered by the town is quite large however the rest of the commune is mostly forest in the west and farmland in the east.

The Suzon stream passes through the length of the commune from the north, forming part of the north-eastern boundary and flowing to the southern border and south to Dijon.

Neighbouring communes and villages

Heraldry

Administration

List of Successive Mayors of Ahuy

Population

Distribution of age groups
Percentage Distribution of Age Groups in Ahuy and Côte-d'Or Department in 2017

Source: INSEE

Culture and heritage

Civil heritage
The commune has many buildings and structures that are registered as historical monuments:

A House at 8 Place du 8-Mai-1945 (18th century)
A Roman Public Bath at 9 Ruelle au Beau (Antiquity)
Comberons House at Chemin rural No. 11 (19th century)
A House at 1 Grande-Rue (19th century)
A House at 19 Grande-Rue (19th century)
A House at 28 Grande-Rue (19th century)
A House and Oratory at 3 Grande-Rue (17th century)
A House at 36 Grande-Rue (19th century)
A House at 40 Grande-Rue (19th century)
La Colombière House at 6 Grande-Rue (18th century)
A Well (19th century)
A House at 3 Rue du Puits-de-Bois (19th century)
An Orchard at Rue du Puits-de-Bois (19th century)
A Farmhouse at 1 Rue des Tilleuls (19th century)
A House at 13 Rue des Tilleuls (19th century)
A Portal at 2 Rue des Tilleuls (1669)
A House at 3 Rue des Tilleuls (1870)
A Portal at 4 Rue des Tilleuls (17th century)
A Portal at 3 Rue des Écoles (19th century)

Other sites of interest
In the Circuit du four à chaux there is an old lime kiln.
Ahuy is surrounded by walking trails and several hiking trails are accessible only 20 minutes from Dijon town centre by bus or tram. Paths are largely in the forest and marked so that it the walker can choose any suitable route.
Ahuy also has a football field, next to which tables are installed picnic under trees in a large expanse of grass. This is a very quiet area and sometimes activities are organized. There are also two tennis courts used by the Ahuy tennis club nearby.
The Mille-club is a festival hall party that hosts several activities.

Religious heritage

The commune has several religious buildings and structures that are registered as historical monuments:
The Church of Saint Agnan (12th century). The Church has several items that are registered as historical objects:
A Painting: the Crucifixion (16th century)
A Statue: Saint Agnan (17th century)
A Statue: Saint Bernard (17th century)
A Processional Staff: Saint George slaying the dragon (16th century)
A Statue: Virgin and child (16th century)
A Statue: Virgin and child seated (17th century)
A Calvary at Chemin du Moulin (19th century)
The Portal of the former Priory of the Abbots of Saint-Étienne of Dijon (16th century)
The Belle-Croix Cemetery Chapel (1511). The Chapel has two items which are registered as historical objects:
A Bas-relief: Virgin and child (15th century)
The Furniture in the Chapel

Environmental heritage
The Plateau of Hauteville and Ahuy is a Site of Community Importance remarkable for its Calcareous grassland type vegetation.

See also
 French wine
 Communes of the Côte-d'Or department

References

External links
Ahuy on the old IGN website 
Society of Music of Ahuy 
Ahuy on Géoportail, National Geographic Institute (IGN) website 
Ahuy on the 1750 Cassini Map

Communes of Côte-d'Or